August Lütke-Westhüs (25 July 1926 – 8 September 2000) was a German equestrian and Olympic champion. He won a gold medal in show jumping with the German team at the 1956 Summer Olympics in Stockholm. 

His brother Alfons Lütke-Westhues was also an equestrian, and won an Olympic gold medal.

References

1926 births
2000 deaths
German male equestrians
Olympic equestrians of the United Team of Germany
Olympic silver medalists for the United Team of Germany
Equestrians at the 1956 Summer Olympics
Olympic medalists in equestrian

Medalists at the 1956 Summer Olympics